In the mathematical field of graph theory, the flower snarks form an infinite family of snarks introduced by Rufus Isaacs in 1975.

As snarks, the flower snarks are connected, bridgeless cubic graphs with chromatic index equal to 4. The flower snarks are non-planar and non-hamiltonian. The flower snarks  J5 and J7 have book thickness 3 and queue number 2.

Construction
The flower snark Jn can be constructed with the following process :
 Build n copies of the star graph on 4 vertices. Denote the central vertex of each star Ai and the outer vertices Bi, Ci and Di. This results in a disconnected graph on 4n vertices with 3n edges (Ai – Bi, Ai – Ci and Ai – Di for 1 ≤ i ≤ n).
 Construct the n-cycle (B1... Bn). This adds n edges.
 Finally construct the 2n-cycle (C1... CnD1... Dn). This adds 2n edges.

By construction, the Flower snark Jn is a cubic graph with 4n vertices and 6n edges.  For it to have the required properties, n should be odd.

Special cases
The name flower snark is sometimes used for J5, a flower snark with 20 vertices and 30 edges. It is one of 6 snarks on 20 vertices . The flower snark J5 is hypohamiltonian.

J3 is a trivial variation of the Petersen graph formed by replacing one of its vertices by a triangle. This graph is also known as the Tietze's graph. In order to avoid trivial cases, snarks are generally restricted to have girth at least 5. With that restriction, J3 is not a snark.

Gallery

References 

Parametric families of graphs
Regular graphs